There is maximum allocation of 220 athletes distributed through qualification events in 2010 and 2011.
Quota Allocation per gender can vary depending on number of entries.

Qualification timeline 

BMX qualification was with the end of the 2010 BMX rankings, with the athletes unknown as of January 2011.

Track cycling

Men

Team Sprint

Individual Sprint

Road cycling
Each NOC can enter a maximum of 4 male and 3 female.

Men

 The Caribbean championship was to qualify 4 male athletes in any discipline, but all four were qualified in the road competition. This however does not take away from the quota for the road discipline for males.

Women

Mountain biking
Each NOC may enter up to 2 athletes each.

Men

Women

BMX

Men

Women

References

External links 
 Official website with results of qualification tournaments
 Quota allocation after the 2011 Pan American Championship

Qualification for the 2011 Pan American Games
Cycling at the 2011 Pan American Games